Congolese Olympic Committee (IOC code: COD) is the National Olympic Committee representing Democratic Republic of Congo.

References

Democratic Republic of Congo